Denys Obiyeze Ndukve (born 28 February 2000) is a Ukrainian professional footballer who plays as a left midfielder for Ukrainian club Chaika Petropavlivska Borshchahivka.

References

External links
 
 
 
 Profile on fotbalpraha.cz

2000 births
Living people
Footballers from Kharkiv
Ukrainian footballers
Association football midfielders
FC Metalist 1925 Kharkiv players
FC Kramatorsk players
SC Chaika Petropavlivska Borshchahivka players
Ukrainian First League players
Ukrainian Second League players
Ukrainian expatriate footballers
Expatriate footballers in the Czech Republic
Ukrainian expatriate sportspeople in the Czech Republic